Kerstin Bodin (born 2 August 1950) is a Swedish sports shooter. She competed in the women's 10 metre air pistol event at the 1988 Summer Olympics.

References

1950 births
Living people
Swedish female sport shooters
Olympic shooters of Sweden
Shooters at the 1988 Summer Olympics
Sport shooters from Stockholm
20th-century Swedish women